Interstate 73 (I-73) is a partially completed Interstate Highway in the US state of North Carolina, traversing the state from south of Ellerbe to near Summerfield through Asheboro and Greensboro. When completed, it will continue south toward Myrtle Beach, South Carolina, and north to Martinsville, Virginia.

Route description

, I-73 begins south of Ellerbe, in concurrency with I-74 and U.S. Highway 220 (US 220), to north of Asheboro. I-73 and I-74 travel north through northern Richmond County and into eastern Montgomery County. In Montgomery County, the Interstates pass between the county's eastern border and the Uwharrie National Forest. The freeway enters Randolph County and passes just west of Asheboro. In Randleman, I-74 splits northwest toward High Point and Winston-Salem. North of the I-74 split, I-73 passes over Randleman Lake, a reservoir formed by the blocking of the Deep River and passes into Guilford County. Entering Greensboro, it ends its concurrency with US 220 as it goes northwest along the Greensboro Urban Loop with US 421 after a brief parallel with I-85. At its connection with I-40, US 421 continues north (or geographically west) with I-40 to Winston-Salem, while I-73 continues and I-840 begins. At the Bryan Boulevard exit, I-73 separates from I-840, the latter continuing northeast along the partially completed loop. Meanwhile, I-73 turns westward, passing Piedmont Triad International Airport and continuing until it crosses NC 68. The road then resumes its northward direction, stretching  before reconverging with US 220 near the Haw River. It then proceeds  further north along a newly widened stretch of US 220 to another interchange with NC 68 which was completed in December 2017 but not signed as I-73 until March 2018.

History

Authorized by the Intermodal Surface Transportation Efficiency Act of 1991 (ISTEA), I-73 was established as a north–south high-priority corridor from Charleston, South Carolina, to Detroit, Michigan.

In North Carolina, because several U.S. Highways were already planned for improvements in the central Piedmont region, I-73 was initially aligned to go through Rockingham, Asheboro, High Point, Winston-Salem, and Mount Airy. The route through High Point was approved in May 1993. However, in November 1993, an organization called Job Link, made up of business leaders from northern North Carolina and southern Virginia, wanted a major highway to connect Roanoke with the Greensboro area. It could be I-73, the group said, but did not have to be. In April 1995, John Warner, who chaired the Senate subcommittee which would select the route of I-73, announced his support for the Job Link proposal. This distressed Winston-Salem officials who were counting on I-73, though Greensboro had never publicly sought the road. But an aide to US Senator Lauch Faircloth said the 1991 law authorizing I-73 required the road to go through Winston-Salem. Faircloth got around this requirement, though, by asking Warner to call the highway to Winston-Salem I-74. In May, Warner announced plans to propose legislation that made the plan for two Interstates official.

When I-73 crossed a border between two states, the federal law authorizing the road required that the two states agree that their sections meet. Originally, both Carolinas selected a route running south from Rockingham. However, North Carolina had more money to spend on roads, and, on May 10, 1995, the US Senate Environment and Public Works Committee approved North Carolina's plan for I-73 to run eastward to the coast and enter South Carolina at North Myrtle Beach. Later that year, officials in both states agreed that I-73 would enter South Carolina south of Rockingham and that the other highway would be I-74. This raised the possibility of I-73 bypassing the Myrtle Beach area entirely, since I-74 would run to the Myrtle Beach area.

In May 1997, the first section of I-73 was established, a  section from south of Candor to Ulah. Signage of "Future Interstate 73" was also placed all along US 220, from Rockingham north to I-40 in Greensboro and south to Candor. On January 7, 2008, a  extension south of Candor to Ellerbe was completed; however, because the North Carolina Department of Transportation (NCDOT) had not applied to the Federal Highway Administration (FHWA) to add the segment to the Interstate System, signage along the new stretch of freeway was listed as Future I-73, thus not an "official" addition to the Interstate at that time. Federal approval was granted in 2010 to make this part of the Interstate System at the conclusion of work to upgrade the highway in Asheboro. The route was given Interstate signage in mid-2013.

The next section to be completed and signed I-73 was the  southwestern section of the Greensboro Urban Loop, in concurrency with I-40, in February 2008. The concurrency later changed to US 421 in September of same year (signage corrected by July 2009).

The newest sections of I-73 to be completed are the  stretch of US 220 freeway in Asheboro, the remaining parts of the US 220 freeway designated Future I-73 in 1997, and the  section from the Bryan Boulevard interchange northward back to US 220. The Asheboro section had several deficiencies that needed to be corrected before it could be designated an Interstate. Work started on this segment from US 220 Business (US 220 Bus.)/NC 134 south of Asheboro to US 220 Bus./Vision Drive north of Asheboro in 2010. Work was completed in October 2012. When work was finished, I-73 (and I-74) shields replaced the Future I-73 (and I-74) shields along this portion of US 220. NCDOT had already reached an agreement with the FHWA that they could sign the entire length of the US 220 freeway south of Greensboro to Ellerbe as I-73 once this project was completed. On July 11, 2012, NCDOT gave final approval an extension of I-73 from I-85 to Asheboro to be designated as part of its network. A contract to change the Future I-73 signs to I-73 shields and replace current exit signage with Interstate standard ones was let on December 11, 2012. In February 2013, work crews began converting a  stretch of signage for I-73 work was completed in December 2013.

Construction began in April 2014 on I-73 from NC 68, near Piedmont Triad International Airport, to US 220 near the Haw River. Seven miles of this section to US 220 in Summerfield opened May 19, 2017, while the remainder opened the evening of July 2, 2017. The latest segment of I-73 being completed was a  segment along a widened section of US 220 from near the Haw River north to its intersection with NC 68. Two contracts, one widening US 220, Project R-2413C, which started in May 2012, the other reconfiguring the NC 68 intersection into an interchange, started in September 2015, were completed in December 2017. The new NC 68 south interchange opened in May 2017. I-73 signs, including an "End I-73" sign beyond the NC 68 exit, were put up in March 2018.

Future
I-73 from the South Carolina state line to US 74/NC 38 interchange is being planned and paid for by the South Carolina Department of Transportation (SCDOT). Environmental studies were completed in 2011, with a route that includes an interchange at Ghio Road and welcome centers at the state line. The time frame when construction will begin is unknown at this time.

The Western Rockingham Bypass, from the US 74/US 74 Bus. interchange to US 220, near Ellerbe, has all right-of-way purchases completed along the proposed route. Construction on a  section, along US 220 (south of Ellerbe), began in March 2014; with a contracted amount of $49.8 million (equivalent to $ in ), and was completed in April 2018. The remaining sections of the new bypass were scheduled to start construction by late 2017; however, under reprioritization of construction projects announced in 2014, they were first removed from the list of projects to be started through 2024 then had funding restored with a construction date of 2022 in mid-2016. In January 2017, however, the project, though still funded, was delayed four years due to a low score in prioritizing projects for the 2018–2027 NCDOT State Transportation Improvement Program. On January 9, 2019, it was announced that the North Carolina State Transportation Improvement Program for 2020 to 2029 included connecting I-73 with US 74 six years sooner than planned. As of March 2022, the completion date was 2024.

The northernmost section,  along US 220 from NC 68 north to the Virginia border, may be the last segment completed with NCDOT waiting to see whether Virginia is going to commit to constructing their section of I-73 south of Roanoke before commitments are made for funding. The only action taken along this segment was to replace the existing Future I-73 Corridor signs with Future I-73 signs in 2016.

Exit list

See also

References

External links

73
 North Carolina
Transportation in Greensboro, North Carolina
Transportation in Richmond County, North Carolina
Transportation in Montgomery County, North Carolina
Transportation in Randolph County, North Carolina
Transportation in Guilford County, North Carolina
Transportation in Rockingham County, North Carolina